The UT Arlington Mavericks men's basketball team is an NCAA Division I college basketball team competing in the Western Athletic Conference. Home games are played at College Park Center, located on the University of Texas at Arlington's campus in Arlington. The team appeared in the 2008 NCAA tournament, losing against the #1 seed Memphis in the first round, although Memphis was later forced to vacate the win due to infractions committed by the program.

History 

The Mavericks are one of the founding teams of the Southland Conference, which began with five institutions on March 15, 1963. Although only 21 of 62 seasons have resulted in an overall winning record, 10 of the past 14 seasons have winning records, including a school record 27 wins in the 2016–2017 season (as of the conclusion of the 2020–21 season). The team won an outright Southland Conference regular season championship in 2011/2012, along with a tie for the 2004 regular season champion and a 2008 conference tournament championship that led to their first NCAA Tournament appearance. The Mavericks played in the Western Athletic Conference in 2012–13 before joining the Sun Belt Conference in 2013–14. The program earned its first Sun Belt regular season title in the record-setting 2016–17 season.

Facilities 

Until February 2012, the Mavericks played at Texas Hall, which is a 3,300-seat theater on the campus. The teams played on the stage, and fans could watch the game from either the theater seats or the bleacher section.

A new arena called the College Park Center with a seating capacity of 7,000 hosted the final four regular season home games for the team in 2012. The facility is located on the eastern side of the campus along with new housing, parking, and retail developments.

Coaches 
The Mavericks have had 9 coaches, listed below, in their 62-year history.

 Tom Tinker – 1959–1966 (7 seasons)
 Barry Dowd – 1966–1976 (10 seasons)
 Bob "Snake" LeGrand – 1976–1987 (11 seasons)
 Jerry Stone – 1987–1988 (1 season)
 Mark Nixon – 1988–1992 (4 seasons)
 Eddie McCarter – 1992–2006 (14 seasons)
 Scott Cross – 2006–2018 (12 seasons)
 Chris Ogden – 2018–2021 (3 seasons)
 Greg Young - 2021–2023
 Royce "Snoop" Johnson - 2023 (Interim Head coach)
 K. T. Turner – 2023– (1 seasons)

Postseason results

NCAA tournament results
The Mavericks have appeared in the NCAA tournament once. Their record is 0–1.

^Memphis win vacated for NCAA infractions

NIT results
The Mavericks have appeared in the National Invitation Tournament (NIT) three times. Their combined record is 2–3.

CIT results
The Mavericks have appeared in the CollegeInsider.com Postseason Tournament (CIT) two times. Their combined record is 1–2.

Season-by-season results

References

External links